Leucandra villosa is a species of calcareous sponge in the family Grantiidae. The sponge lives in the sea and its sclereid consists of calcium carbonate. The scientific name of the species was first published in 1885 by Lendenfeld.

References 

Sponges described in 1885
Calcarea